Přívoz (briefly till 1920 and 1939-1945 also Oderfurt) is a part of the city of Ostrava, Moravian-Silesian Region in the Czech Republic. It lies in the Moravian part of the city, in the administrative district of Moravská Ostrava a Přívoz.

It lies in the historical region of Moravia and was first mentioned in a written document in 1377 as Prsiewoz.

Heavy industrialization that occurred in Ostrava in the second half of the 19th century also affected Přívoz. Railroad line was built there, coke-processing plant was constructed in 1909 together with a power plant. Industrialization had impact also on demographics, influx of migrant workers occurred.

Přívoz was formerly an independent municipality, in 1900 it gained town rights, in 1924 it became a part of Ostrava.

The most important landmark in Přívoz is Immaculate Conception of Virgin Mary Church.

Polish writer Wiesław Adam Berger was born here, as was German silent film actress Gilda Langer.

Footnotes

References
 

Ostrava
Neighbourhoods in the Czech Republic